The 2005 Judgment Day was the seventh Judgment Day professional wrestling pay-per-view (PPV) event produced by World Wrestling Entertainment (WWE). It was held exclusively for wrestlers from the promotion's SmackDown! brand division. The event took place on May 22, 2005, at the Target Center in Minneapolis, Minnesota.

The main event was an "I Quit" match featuring two wrestlers fighting until one stated "I Quit." WWE Champion John Cena defeated John "Bradshaw" Layfield (JBL) to retain his championship. Two featured bouts were scheduled on the undercard. In respective standard wrestling matches, Rey Mysterio Jr. defeated Eddie Guerrero and Booker T defeated Kurt Angle.

Judgment Day grossed over $500,000 in ticket sales from an attendance of 9,500, and received 220,000 pay-per-view buys. This event helped WWE increase its pay-per-view revenue by $4.7 million compared to the previous year.

Production

Background
Judgment Day was first held by World Wrestling Entertainment (WWE) as the 25th In Your House pay-per-view (PPV) in October 1998. It then returned in May 2000 as its own event, establishing Judgment Day as the promotion's annual May PPV. The 2005 event was the seventh event in the Judgment Day chronology and was held on May 22 at the Target Center in Minneapolis, Minnesota. Like the previous year's event, it featured wrestlers exclusively from the SmackDown! brand.

Storylines
The event featured seven professional wrestling matches that involved different wrestlers from pre-existing scripted feuds, plots and storylines. Wrestlers portrayed either a villainous or fan favorite gimmick as they followed a series of events which generally built tension, leading to a wrestling match. The name of a wrestler's character was not always the person's birth name, as wrestlers often use a stage name to portray their character. All wrestlers were from the SmackDown! brand – a storyline division in which WWE assigned its employees to a different program, the other being Raw.

The main event at Judgment Day was between John Cena and John "Bradshaw" Layfield (JBL) over the WWE Championship in an "I Quit" match. The previous month at WrestleMania 21, Cena defeated JBL to win the WWE Championship. On the April 7 episode of SmackDown!, SmackDown! General Manager Theodore Long scheduled a series of number one contenders matches, after JBL, Eddie Guerrero, Rey Mysterio Jr., The Big Show, Booker T, and Kurt Angle all demanded a WWE Championship match. The first match that Long announced was between JBL and Rey Mysterio. Mysterio was disqualified, after Eddie Guerrero interfered and attacked JBL, resulting in JBL winning the match. The following week on SmackDown!, Guerrero and Kurt Angle were scheduled for the second contender's match. Angle advanced to the finals, as he went on to defeat Guerrero. Later during the program, Cena unveiled a spinner version of the WWE championship. Before the unveiling, however, JBL came out wearing the original WWE championship. On the April 21 episode of SmackDown!, Booker T and Big Show were booked in another contenders match. After the match ended in a double disqualification, Long booked JBL, Angle, Booker T, and Big Show in a Fatal Four-Way match for the following week. JBL won the match, after he pinned Angle and having the right to face Cena at Judgment Day for the WWE Championship. On the May 5 episode of SmackDown!, Cena proposed that he would defend the championship against JBL in an "I Quit" match. Two weeks later, on the May 19 episode of SmackDown!, JBL faced Scotty 2 Hotty, which Scotty won after JBL was disqualified. After the match, however, JBL attacked Scotty and demanded that he say "I quit." JBL further the assault, choking him with a leather belt, Scotty said "I quit." That same night, Cena defeated The Basham Brothers (Doug Basham and Danny Basham) in a handicap match. During the duration of the match, JBL, who was at ringside, yelled at Cena, telling him to say "I quit."

One of the featured preliminary matches was Rey Mysterio versus Eddie Guerrero in a singles match. One month prior to Judgment Day, at WrestleMania 21, Mysterio defeated Guerrero. In the weeks that followed, Guerrero and Mysterio were challenged by MNM (Joey Mercury, Johnny Nitro, and Melina) to defend the WWE Tag Team Championship, which Guerrero and Mysterio accepted. MNM defeated Guerrero and Mysterio to win the WWE Tag Team Championship. On the April 28 episode of SmackDown!, Guerrero and Mysterio were given a rematch for the WWE Tag Team Championship. During the match, however, Mysterio accidentally performed a flying body press on Guerrero which led to Guerrero abandoning Mysterio, but returned as the fans urged Guerrero to come back. MNM retained the belt after pinning Mysterio for the win. The following week, Theodore Long booked a Street Fight between Mysterio and Guerrero's nephew, Chavo Guerrero Jr. Mysterio came out as the winner of the match. After the match (which Mysterio won), Chavo, Mercury, and Nitro attacked Mysterio, which prompted Guerrero to come out and clear the ring. Guerrero, however, attacked Mysterio. The assault led to Guerrero lifting Mysterio off the ground and driving Mysterio's back on the ring steps. This angle saw Guerrero turn into a villain. As a result, the following week, Long promoted a match between Guerrero and Mysterio at Judgment Day.

The other featured preliminary match was Kurt Angle versus Booker T in a singles match. On the April 28 episode of SmackDown!, Angle, Booker T, Big Show and JBL took part in a Fatal four-way match to determine the number one contender for the WWE Championship, which JBL won. During the match, Angle hit Booker T with a steel chair to eliminate him. Booker came back and hit Angle with a chair to cause him to be eliminated. The following week, Angle challenged Booker T to a match at Judgment Day, which Booker accepted. Prior to that, Angle had insulted Booker T's wife, Sharmell, which led to Booker T attacking and accepting Angle's challenge. On the May 12 episode of SmackDown!, Angle admitted he would like to have "perverted sex" with Sharmell. That same night, Angle and Booker T were scheduled in a match, which led to Angle leaving the ring and going backstage to Sharmell. Booker T went backstage and found Sharmell on the floor crying. This led to Angle attacking Booker T from behind and pushing him towards a pair of steel lockers. The following week, Long suspended Angle and demanded that Angle apologize for his actions. Angle apologized, but admitted that he actually kissed Sharmell and let her fondle his "private parts" before Booker T made his way to the locker room. Booker T, while watching the interview kicked a television monitor down and broke it.

#1 contender tournament bracket

Event

Before the Judgment Day event aired live on pay-per-view, Nunzio defeated Akio in a match that aired on Sunday Night Heat.

Preliminary matches

After Sunday Night Heat, the pay-per-view began with a tag team match where MNM (Joey Mercury and Johnny Nitro) (with Melina) defended the WWE Tag Team Championship against the team of Hardcore Holly and Charlie Haas. The match started off with Nitro and Haas in the ring. Haas took the advantage in the match and was able to tag in Holly. There was back and forth action between the two teams, as all of the superstars were able to participate in the match. After a Snapshot to Haas, Mercury pinned Haas, which resulted in MNM retaining the tag team titles.

The second wrestling match on the pay-per-view was The Big Show versus Carlito, who was accompanied by Matt Morgan. For the duration of the match, Big Show used his body size to his advantage as he squashed, or easily and quickly performed moves on Carlito. The momentum changed, when Carlito gained control part way through the match. In the end, Big Show accidentally whipped Carlito into the referee. This saw Carlito hit a low blow on Big Show. Carlito won the match and gained the successful pinfall after Morgan delivered an F-5 to Big Show.

The next match was a standard match for the WWE Cruiserweight Championship, in which Paul London defended the title against Chavo Guerrero. After back and forth action between the two, London was able to perform a 450° splash. London then pinned Guerrero to retain the WWE Cruiserweight title.

The final preliminary match was Kurt Angle versus Booker T. After Booker T backed Angle into the ring ropes and executed a shoulder charge, Angle began to bleed from the mouth. The match saw exchange offense from both Angle and Booker T. The match came to an end when Angle attempted an Angle Slam, but Booker T grabbed Angle's leg and rolled him into a pinfall victory.

Main event matches

The first featured match was for the WWE United States Championship, where Orlando Jordan defended the title against Heidenreich. As the match began, Jordan was able to perform a dropkick, sending Heidenreich through the ropes to the outside. Heidenreich, however, would gain the advantage after countering Jordan's attack from the top rope into a suplex. Afterwards, Jordan delivered a DDT and pinned Heidenreich to retain the United States title.

The next match was Eddie Guerrero versus Rey Mysterio in a standard match. In the match, Mysterio tried to counter Guerrero's offense, but Guerrero blocked all of Mysterio's attempts. Mysterio gained the advantage when he was able to execute a flying headbutt to Guerrero. Chavo ran down to the ring to distract the referee, as Eddie grabbed a chair. Guerrero then attempted to hit Mysterio with the chair, but Mysterio dodged it with a low dropkick and performed another low dropkick, setting up Guerrero on the ropes for a 619. Mysterio won after Guerrero was disqualified for attacking him with a steel chair.

The main event was the "I Quit" match for the WWE Championship, in which John Cena defended his title against JBL. Cena came out on the flatbed of a semi truck with a DJ on a turntable mixing his theme song. During the match, both Cena and JBL were able to get in offense. Cena performed a Back Body Drop through an announce table on JBL. Shortly after, JBL struck Cena with a steel chair which caused Cena to bleed from his forehead. JBL performed a Clothesline from Hell on Cena, who later performed an FU on JBL. Later in the match, in the ramp area, Cena threw JBL through a television monitor, causing JBL to bleed. JBL quit as Cena prepared to attacked him with an exhaust pipe, which was from the semi truck, meaning Cena retained the WWE Championship. After the match, Cena struck JBL with the exhaust pipe, causing him to fall through a glass panel that was part of the entrance stage.

Reception
The Target Center had a maximum capacity of 20,000, which was reduced for the event. This event grossed over $500,000 from an approximate attendance of 9,500, the maximum allowed. It also received 220,000 pay-per-view buys. Judgment Day helped WWE earn $21.6 million in revenue from pay-per-view events versus $16.9 million the previous year, which was later confirmed by Linda McMahon on September 7, 2005 in a quarterly result. Canadian Online Explorer's professional wrestling section rated the event a 5 out of 10 stars. The rating was lower than the Judgment Day event in 2006, which was said to be an entertaining pay-per-view to watch. The "I Quit" match between John Cena and JBL was rated an eight out of 10 stars. Additionally, the match between Orlando Jordan and Heidenreich was rated a 4 out of 10 stars.

The event was released on DVD on June 21, 2005 by Sony Music Entertainment.

Aftermath
On the June 6 episode of Raw, one of WWE's primary television programs, John Cena's SmackDown! tenure came to an end when he became the first wrestler selected by Raw General Manager Eric Bischoff in the draft lottery, a mock sports draft lottery in which wrestlers switched programs. Cena immediately entered a staged rivalry with Eric Bischoff after when he refused to participate in Bischoff's "war" against the upcoming Extreme Championship Wrestling reunion show. Cena went on to resume his feud with Christian, as they had an encounter at the Royal Rumble in January. During the feud, Chris Jericho was involved as well, as he protested Bischoff's actions of scheduling a WWE championship match between Cena and Christian at Vengeance. After defeating Christian and Tyson Tomko in a tag team match, Jericho betrayed Cena. Convinced with the outcome of the events, Bischoff changed the original match between Christian and Cena to a Triple Threat Match, involving Jericho for the WWE Championship at Vengeance. At the event, Cena retained the WWE Championship.

On the June 30 episode of SmackDown!, a match between six wrestlers for a new top-tier SmackDown! championship was held. JBL, one of the participants, was victorious in the match, but Theodore Long announced that he was still not the champion. Instead he had won the right to a match against the World Heavyweight champion, Batista, who was SmackDown!'s final 2005 draft pick, making the World Heavyweight Championship exclusive to SmackDown!. The following week, it was announced Batista would meet JBL at The Great American Bash with the World Heavyweight championship on the line. At the Great American Bash, Batista was disqualified for attacking JBL with a chair and JBL was declared the winner. In WWE, a title cannot be won by disqualification, but only by pinfall or submission (the normal scoring conditions in professional wrestling matches). As a result, Batista retained the title.

On the June 13 episode of Raw, Kurt Angle's tenure with SmackDown! came to an end, as he was also drafted to the Raw brand. There, he immediately continued his feud with Shawn Michaels. At the start of the year, Angle and Michaels both participated in the Royal Rumble match at the January pay-per-view event. During the match, Michaels eliminated Angle. In retaliation, Angle returned to the match and eliminated Michaels and then attacked him outside the ring. The two engaged in a feud, which led to an Interpromotional match at WrestleMania 21, as Angle was part of the SmackDown! roster and Michaels belonged to the Raw roster. At WrestleMania 21, Angle got the win over Michaels by forcing him to submit to an ankle lock submission hold. The same evening Angle was drafted, Michaels challenged Angle to a WrestleMania 21 rematch at Vengeance, in which Angle accepted. At Vengeance, the rematch saw Michaels defeat Angle.

The angle between Eddie Guerrero and Rey Mysterio continued. On an episode of SmackDown!, Guerrero threatened to reveal a secret concerning Mysterio's son Dominik. This led the families of both Guerrero and Mysterio pleading with Guerrero not to reveal the secret. At the Great American Bash, Mysterio defeated Guerrero in a match where if Guerrero lost, he could not reveal the secret. On the July 28 episode of SmackDown!, Guerrero, however, revealed the secret, claiming he was Dominick's scripted biological father. The storyline also went on that Guerrero knew Mysterio was having trouble starting his own family, so Guerrero left Dominick to be raised by Mysterio's family. In subsequent weeks, Guerrero threatened to take custody of Dominick, drawing up custody papers and having his lawyer present them to Mysterio. This led to a Ladder match, a match where the objective was to climb a ladder and reach an object hanging above the ring, between the two for the custody of Dominick at SummerSlam, which Mysterio won.

Results

Notes

References
(2005). Judgment Day [DVD]. World Wrestling Entertainment.

External links
Official Judgment Day 2005 Website

2005
2005 in Minnesota
Events in Minneapolis
Professional wrestling in Minneapolis
2005 WWE pay-per-view events
May 2005 events in the United States
WWE SmackDown